Octavio Augusto Pérez Ocaña (7 November 1998 – 29 October 2021) was a Mexican actor known for his role of Benito in the television series Vecinos.

He began his career in the program Chabelo, in a section called Chiquillos y Chiquillas. He also participated in Lola...Érase una vez, and the Mexican film Amor letra por letra.

Death
On the morning of 29 October 2021, Ocaña was shot to death at the age of 22 on a highway of Cuautitlán Izcalli, State of Mexico. The reason he was shot is under investigation. According to the prosecutor's initial investigation, Ocaña was driving a Jeep Cherokee on the streets of the municipality and was accompanied by two subjects who were later identified as friends of his father. The local police requested him to stop but Ocaña ignored them. During the pursuit, Ocaña collided with several vehicles and later entered the Chamapa-Lechería highway. At some point, according to the investigation, Ocaña grabbed a gun and accidentally shot himself in the chin. Witnesses claim otherwise stating that police shot at him and planted the gun in his right hand while he was left handed. He died en route to the hospital. It is speculated that the state police had alterior motives to be stopping Octavio and that he was murdered by the police who later staged the act as a suicide. Onsite reports show that he was not immediately called an ambulance after being shot. Video evidence shows that he was still alive long after the police stopped him and he suffered on the side of the road. Follow-up by the government is in progress to investigate corruption and issues with the original police story given which is inconsistent with video evidence available.

Filmography

References

1998 births
2021 deaths
21st-century Mexican male actors
Deaths by firearm in Mexico
History of the State of Mexico
Male actors from Tabasco
Mexican male child actors
Mexican male film actors
Mexican male telenovela actors
People from Villahermosa